The LFA Super Taça or the LFA Super Cup is an East Timorese football championship contested by the winners of Liga Futebol Amadora and the Taça 12 de Novembro.

In the event that a team wins both Liga Futebol Amadora Primeira Divisão and the Taça 12 de Novembro, the runners up of the Taça 12 de Novembro will play against the winner of Liga Futebol Amadora.

Finals by year

2016

2017

2018

2019

2020
In 2020, the LFA Super Taça match was not played, because in addition to the COVID-19 pandemic, the Lalenok United team was again champion of the two competitions that would give place in the LFA Super Taça.

Participating Clubs

Titles by team in Super Taça

See also
 Football in East Timor

References

External links
Official website
Official Facebook page

Football competitions in East Timor
2016 establishments in East Timor
National association football supercups
Recurring sporting events established in 2016